Jean Morlet (13 January 1931 – 27 April 2007) was a French geophysicist who pioneered work in the field of wavelet analysis around the year 1975. He invented the term wavelet to describe the functions he was using. In 1981, Morlet worked with Alex Grossmann to develop what is now known as the Wavelet transform.

Biography
Morlet graduated from the École Polytechnique in 1952 and was research engineer at Elf Aquitaine when he invented wavelets to solve signal processing problems for oil prospecting.

Awards
He was awarded in 1997 with the Reginald Fessenden Award. He was awarded in 2001 with the first prize Prix Chéreau Lavet, from the Académie des Technologies.

Legacy
The Jean-Morlet Chair at the Centre International de Rencontres Mathématiques is named in his honor.

Notes

References

2007 deaths
French geophysicists
1931 births
Place of birth missing
École Polytechnique alumni
Applied mathematicians